Choum is a town in northern Mauritania, lying in the Adrar Region close to the border with Western Sahara. In the year 2000, Choum had a population of 2,735.

History 

The town grew from its position on trans-Saharan trading routes. It declined with the trade, and, in 1977, was attacked by French troops as a suspected base of the Polisario Front, the national liberation movement fighting for independence for the Western Sahara. Fortifications from the period survive around the town.

Transport
Choum is a stop on the Mauritania Railway from Nouadhibou on the Atlantic coast to Zouérat, and a transport interchange for access to the Adrar Plateau and the Mauritanian capital Nouakchott.

Railway tunnel  

The town stands on a spur of land which carries the major turning-point in the border between Mauritania and the Western Sahara. In the early 1960s, the French colonial authorities in Mauritania wished to build the line from Nouadhibou to Zouérat to exploit the iron ore reserves at Zouérat. The Spanish authorities then responsible for the Western Sahara negotiated to allow the railway to be built through Spanish territory over relatively level desert, but imposed conditions unacceptable to the French. 
The French engineers therefore built the line parallel with the border and tunneled through the Choum hillspur — two kilometres through solid granite just to stay within French territory. The tunnel has been called a "monument to European stupidity in Africa". 
The absurdity was highlighted when the southern part of the territory of Western Sahara was briefly administered by Mauritania after the Spanish withdrew in 1975/1976. The tunnel is no longer in use and a 5 km section of the railway cuts right through the POLISARIO controlled part of the Western Sahara.

The N1 highway from Atar now runs all the way to north Zouérat, but the sandy track paralleling the railway west to Nouadhibou traverses low dune cordons so is much easier in a 4WD. Regular vehicles can be loaded onto a flatbed wagon at Choum.

See also 

 Railway stations in Mauritania

References

External links

Communes of Adrar Region
Railway stations in Mauritania